Aldair Sapalo Amaro Neto (born 22 July 1994) simply Aldair or Aldair Neto, is an Angolan footballer who plays for Shamakhi as a forward.

Football career
Born in Luanda, Neto spent his youth career in Portugal, with G.D. Rio de Mouro, Sporting CP, Real SC, C.F. União de Coimbra and S.C. Braga. He made his senior debut in 2013 with A.D. Oeiras of the Lisbon Football Association's first district league, and in the new year joined C.D. Fátima in the third tier. 

On 8 August 2014, Neto signed a five-year contract with C.S. Marítimo B in Segunda Liga. He made his professional debut the next day in a 2–1 loss at C.D. Aves, as a 61st-minute substitute for Gonçalo Reyes. He became a regular in the third tier following the Madeirans' relegation, and in August 2018 he transferred across the league to G.D. Gafanha. He scored on his debut, a 1–1 home draw with U.S.C. Paredes on 12 August.

In August 2019, after a successful trial following his release from Marítimo, Neto joined Bangor City in the Cymru North, the second tier of Welsh football. He and Yalany Baio were released in December.

References

External links

1994 births
Footballers from Luanda
Angolan footballers
Living people
Association football forwards
AD Oeiras players
C.D. Fátima players
Liga Portugal 2 players
Segunda Divisão players
Bangor City F.C. players
Cymru Alliance players
Angolan expatriate footballers
Expatriate footballers in Wales
Angolan expatriates in the United Kingdom
G.D. Gafanha players